MicroEJ (pronounced "micro-EDGE") is a French-American software vendor with headquarters in Nantes, France and offices in Boston, Massachusetts, USA. It was founded by Fred Rivard in 2004. It is known for developing MICROEJ VEE, a Virtual Execution Environment for embedded software development and other software development tools such as the software development kit MICROEJ SDK.

History 
Fred Rivard founded MicroEJ under the name Industrial Smart Software Technologies (IS2T). MicroEJ established its offices in Boston in 2016.

At the 2020 Consumer Electronics Show (CES), MicroEJ announced plans to release an app store platform for IoT devices.

MicroEJ partnered with Groupe SEB to integrate MICROEJ VEE into its food processor products in 2021. In the same year, MicroEJ also partnered with NXP Semiconductors to offer a MICROEJ VEE platform on NXP's i.MX RT500 MCU for wearables.

At CES 2022, MicroEJ launched the first containerized software platform for smart home and industrial devices connected using the Matter protocol. In 2022, MicroEJ also partnered with Thales to offer MICROEJ  VEE on the Thales Cinterion IoT Module and Plug and Play IoT Devices. MicroEJ also partnered with Telit to develop Telit IoT cellular modules' software development ecosystem.

References 

Companies established in 2004
Software companies of France